Luis Fernando Vásquez Díaz (born 3 January 2003), commonly known as Lucho, is a Colombian professional footballer who plays as a defender for 2. Liga club Kapfenberger SV, on loan from Red Bull Salzburg.

Career statistics

Club

Notes

References

2003 births
Living people
Colombian footballers
Colombian expatriate footballers
Association football defenders
2. Liga (Austria) players
FC Red Bull Salzburg players
SV Horn players
FC Liefering players
Colombian expatriate sportspeople in Austria
Expatriate footballers in Austria
Sportspeople from Cauca Department